The men's 100 metre freestyle event at the 11th FINA World Swimming Championships (25m) took place 15 – 16 December 2012 at the Sinan Erdem Dome.

Records
Prior to this competition, the existing world and championship records were as follows.

No new records were set during this competition.

Results

Heats

Semifinals

Final

The final was held at 19:00.

References

Freestyle 0100 metre, men's
World Short Course Swimming Championships